The 2nd Emmy Awards, retroactively known as the 2nd Primetime Emmy Awards after the debut of the Daytime Emmy Awards, were presented at the Ambassador Hotel in Los Angeles, California on January 27, 1950. Like the 1st Primetime Emmy Awards, Emmys were primarily given out to Los Angeles-based TV shows and stations. The Awards Committee was chaired by Martha Gaston Bigelow of KFOX radio.

Several new award categories were introduced, including "Best Sports Coverage". However, it would be a few decades later until that category would become a permanent fixture in the Sports Emmys.

Winners and nominees
Winners are listed first, highlighted in boldface, and indicated with a double dagger (‡).

Programs

{| class="wikitable"
|+ 
|-
| style="vertical-align:top;" width="50%" | 
Texaco Star Theatre (KNBH)Studio One (KTTV)
The Fred Waring Show (KTTV)
The Goldbergs (KTTV)
| style="vertical-align:top;" width="50%" | Time for Beany (KTLA)Cyclone Malone (KNBH)
Kukla, Fran and Ollie (KNBH)
|-
| style="vertical-align:top;" width="50%" | The Ed Wynn Show (KTTV)Pantomime Quiz (KTTV)
Your Witness (KECA)
| style="vertical-align:top;" width="50%" | Crusade in Europe (KTTV)Ford News and Weather (KNBH)
Kathy Fiscus Rescue (KTLA)
Man's Best Friend (KTLA)
Nuremberg Trials (KTSL)
Teleforum (KTLA)
|}

Hosting

Sports
{| class="wikitable"
|+ 
|-
| style="vertical-align:top;" | Wrestling (KTLA)Amateur Boxing (KTLA)
Baseball (KLAC)
College Basketball (KTTV)
Ice Hockey (KTLA)
USC-UCLA Football (KECA)
|}

 Best CommercialLucky Strike

References

External links
 Emmys.com list of 1950 Nominees & Winners
 

002
Emmy Awards
1950 in American television
January 1950 events in the United States
1950 in Los Angeles